Diego Martín Vásquez Castro (born 3 July 1971) is a football coach and former player who is currently the manager of the Honduras national team.

Club career
Nicknamed Barbie, Vásquez played most of his career in Honduras as a goalkeeper, most notably for F.C. Motagua where he conquered several titles and individual awards.  He began his career playing for his hometown club San Martín de Mendoza.

His debut for Motagua occurred on 24 August 1997, where he saved two penalty kicks in the 1–0 victory over C.D.S. Vida.  According to Diego, his most memorable event as a player took place in the final series of the 1999–2000 Honduran Liga Nacional season against Club Deportivo Olimpia where after a 0–0 global score, the title had to be decided by penalty shoot-outs in which Vásquez saved the decisive kick to give Motagua its 8th national championship.

Vásquez retired from professional football in 2011 playing for Deportes Savio.

Managerial career
Just as he did as a player, Vásquez began with F.C. Motagua his career as a manager in Honduras in 2013.  The first achievement under his management occurred only a year after in the 2014–15 season, a success which represented Motagua's 13th national title.  In his first shot as a manager, he already owns the accomplishment of having over 300 consecutive games leading a Honduran Liga Nacional club as a coach, surpassing Carlos Padilla, also with Motagua.

Honors

Player
Motagua
 Honduran Liga Nacional (5): 1997–98 A, 1997–98 C, 1999–2000 A, 1999–2000 C, 2001–02 A
 Honduran Liga Nacional best goalkeeper (2): 1997–98 A, 1997–98 C

Universidad
 Honduran Liga Nacional best goalkeeper (1): 2004–05 C

Manager
Motagua
 Honduran Liga Nacional (5): 2014–15 A, 2016–17 A, 2016–17 C, 2018–19 A, 2018–19 C
 Honduran Supercup (1): 2017

References

External links
 
 

1971 births
Living people
Association football goalkeepers
Argentine footballers
Club Atlético River Plate footballers
Club Atlético Huracán footballers
F.C. Motagua players
C.D. Marathón players
C.D. Suchitepéquez players
C.D.S. Vida players
C.D. Victoria players
Deportes Savio players
Liga Nacional de Fútbol Profesional de Honduras players
Expatriate footballers in Honduras
Expatriate footballers in Guatemala
Argentine football managers
F.C. Motagua managers
Honduras national football team managers
Expatriate football managers in Honduras
Sportspeople from Mendoza Province